Bruce Edric Laming (14 June 1938 – 11 September 2017) was an Australian Liberal Party politician in the Queensland parliament. Laming held the seat of Mooloolah from 1992 until 2001 and served as Shadow Public Works and Housing Minister and Deputy Opposition Whip. He is the father of Andrew Laming who was elected to the Australian House of Representatives as the member for the Division of Bowman at the 2004 federal election.

The electorate of Mooloolah was renamed Kawana before the 2001 Queensland state election. At the election, Laming suffered an 18.7 percent swing against him and lost the seat to Labor's Chris Cummins.

Laming died on 11 September 2017 in the Sunshine Coast aged 79, following a long battle with dementia.

Publications
Laming, Bruce, "Scheme for jobless also has benefits for business", Business Queensland, 12 May 1997.

References

1938 births
2017 deaths
Liberal Party of Australia members of the Parliament of Queensland
Members of the Queensland Legislative Assembly
21st-century Australian politicians